"Kung" is a song by the Swedish duo Samir & Viktor. The song was released in Sweden as a digital download on 12 May 2017. The song peaked at number 30 on the Swedish Singles Chart.

Music video
A music video to accompany the release of "Kung" was first released onto YouTube on 13 May 2017 at a total length of three minutes and twenty seconds.

Charts

Release history

References

2017 songs
2017 singles
Samir & Viktor songs
Warner Music Group singles